Slow Down is the fourth studio album by the blues performer Keb' Mo' released in August 1998. In 1999, Slow Down won Keb' Mo' his second Grammy Award for Best Contemporary Blues Album. The album includes the song "Rainmaker" which shares its title with the album Rainmaker, made by Keb' Mo' under his birth name "Kevin Moore".

Track listing

Personnel
John Lewis Parker and Keb' Mo' – producers
Keb' Mo' – vocals, guitars, harmonica
Laval Belle – drums
Reggie McBride – bass guitar
Joellen Friedkin – keyboards (tracks 1, 2, 4, 5, 10, 12), accordion, synthesizer (track 3)
Munyungo Jackson – percussion (tracks 1, 3, 12)
Colin Linden – guitars, mandolin
John Lewis Parker – keyboards, sampling on "Slow Down"
John Barnes – keyboards on "I Don't Know"
Anders Osborne – guitars on "I Was Wrong"; guitars and background vocals on "A Better Man"; background vocals on "God Trying to Get Your Attention"
Reggie Young – trombone on "Slow Down"
Gerald Albright – tenor saxophone on "Slow Down"
Sir Harry Bowens – background vocals on "I Was Wrong", "A Better Man", "God Trying to Get Your Attention"
Sweet Pea Atkinson – background vocals on "I Was Wrong", "God Trying to Get Your Attention"
Lisa Linson – background vocals on "God Trying to Get Your Attention"
Chuck Trammell – producer on "Rainmaker"

Keb' Mo' uses Gibson & Epiphone Guitars, D'Addario Strings, National Resophonic Guitars, Moonshine Slides and Larry Pogreba Custom Guitars

Charts

References

1998 albums
Keb' Mo' albums
Epic Records albums